William Mair FRSE FCS (1868-1948) was a Scottish pharmacist and manufacturing chemist.

Life
He was born in Osborne Place in Dundee in 1868, the son of Thomas Mair a builder. Around 1890 he is working in the pharmacy of Dundee Royal Infirmary.

He was the main Scottish representative to the London chemical company Fletcher Fletcher & Co.

In 1931 he was made an Honorary Fellow of the American Pharmaceutical Association. In 1939 he was elected a Fellow of the Royal Society of Edinburgh. His proposers were Ralph Stockman, James Pickering Kendall, Hugh Ferguson Watson, Robert Taylor Skinner and George Merson.

He died on 1 December 1948.

Publications
Pharmacy in Norway (1921)

Family
He was married to Isabella Jane Urquhart (d.1932).

References

1868 births
1948 deaths
Scientists from Dundee
Scottish chemists
Fellows of the Royal Society of Edinburgh